Plasteel  may refer to:

Plasteel, composite of fiberglass and steel patented by automobile manufacturer Gurgel and first used in 1973
Plasteel (Dune), a durable tough form of steel mentioned by Frank Herbert in his 1965 science fiction novel Dune and its sequels
Plasteel, a metal manufacturing and machining services company; see Boxer (armoured fighting vehicle)